Presidential elections were held in El Salvador on 9 January 1927. The result was a victory for Pío Romero Bosque, who was the only candidate

Results

References

Bibliography
Alvarenga Venutolo, Patricia (1996) Cultura y etica de la violencia San José: EDUCA
Callardo, Ricardo (1961) Las constituciones de El Salvador. I-II Madrid: Ediciones Cultura Hispanica
Vidal, Manuel (1970) Nociones de historia de Centro América San Salvador: Ministerio de Educación. Ninth edition
Webre, Stephen (1979) José Napoleón Duarte and the Christian Democratic Party in Salvadoran Politics 1960-1972 Baton Rouge: Louisiana State University Press

El Salvador
Presidential elections in El Salvador
1927 in El Salvador
Single-candidate elections
Election and referendum articles with incomplete results